George Cuitt may refer to:
George Cuitt the Elder (1743–1818), English painter
George Cuitt the Younger (1779–1854), his son, English painter